Jidda Islands are a group of three small uninhabited islets in Bahrain, lying to the west of Bahrain Island and just north of Umm an Nasan in the Persian Gulf.

History
In 1930 Jidda became the location of one of Bahrain's prisons. Majeed Marhoon, Abdulhadi Khalaf and several other political activists spent time in the prison in the sixties and seventies.
It later became the private property of Prime Minister Khalifa bin Salman Al Khalifa and is currently closed from the public.

Geography
The main island is made of limestone cliffs. It is believed that blocks of rock cut from the island were used in the Barbar temple on Bahrain Island.
The small Mini Bahrain is an artificial island on the south shore made to look exactly like the big Bahrain island.

Demography
The island has a palace, gardens, a helipad, a mosque and several other facilities made for the prime minister and his family, although the island is uninhabited and Sheikh Khalifa himself lived in Riffa, Bahrain Island until his death in November 2020.

Administration
The island belongs to the Northern Governorate of Bahrain.

Transportation
It is connected to Umm an Nasan by a  causeway.

Image gallery

References

External links

 Article about politics of the islands, Abbas al Murshid

Islands of Bahrain
Uninhabited islands
Islands of the Persian Gulf